Mannathu Padmanabhan (2 January 1878 – 25 February 1970 was an Indian social reformer and freedom fighter from the south-western state of Kerala. He is recognised as the founder of the Nair Service Society (NSS), which represents the Nair community that constitutes  15.5% of the population of the state. Padmanabhan is considered as a visionary reformer who organised the Nair community under the NSS.

Early life

Mannathu Padmanabhan Pillai was born in Perunna village in Changanacherry, Kottayam District, British India on 2 January 1878 to Easwaran Namboothiri of Nilavana Illam and Mannathu Parvathy Amma. He began his career as a teacher in 1893 in a Government primary school. After a few years, from 1905 he changed his profession and started practicing law, in the Magistrates Courts.

Nair Service Society

On 31 October 1914, with the help of a few others, he established the Nair Service Society. His main ambition was to uplift the status of the Nair community. From 1915 onwards, he gave up law practice and became the secretary of the Nair Service Society. Mannam revived and reshaped the old concept of village societies, the Karayogams, which practically set the tenor of family and village life. In 1924-25 the NSS persuaded the Travancore Government to enact the Nair Regulation which broke up the matriarchal joint family providing for paternal and maternal property to be divided among all the children. 
Padmanabhan was involved with the Nair Service Society as its secretary for 31 years and as its president for three years. He was honoured with the title Bharata Kesari by the President of India. He also received Padma Bhushan in 1966.

On January 2, 2022, Nair Service Society celebrated the 145th Mannam Jayanthi at NSS headquarters, Perunna in Changanassery.

Political life
He fought for social equality, the first phase being the Vaikom Satyagraha, demanding the public roads near the temple at Vaikom be opened to low caste Hindus.He took part in the Vaikom(1924) and Guruvayoor(1931) temple-entry Satyagrahas; the anti-untouchability agitations. He opened his family temple for everyone, irrespective of caste distinction He became a member of the Indian National Congress in 1946 and took part in the agitation against Sir C. P. Ramaswamy Iyer's administration in Travancore. As the first president of Travancore Devaswom Board he revitalised many temples which had almost ceased to function. On May 25, 1947 Padmanabhan delivered his famous Muthukulam Speech at Muthukulam, Alappuzha. He was arrested for Indian Freedom Movement on 14 June 1947.

In 1949, Padmanabhan became a member of the Travancore Legislative Assembly. In 1959, he along with Christian Churches led a united opposition against the State Communist Ministry, which became known as the Vimochana Samaram (liberation struggle). The cause of the Vimochana Samaram was the introduction of Land reforms  Bill by the Minister KR Gowri ,  and this movement caused the dismissal of the Communist government under E. M. S. Namboodiripad on 31 July 1959. After the success of the movement he famously tethered a white horse at the Kerala Secretariat building as he had challenged to do if the dismissal was successful. The consequence of the dismissal was the beginning of President's rule in the state under Article 356 of the Indian Constitution. In 1964 he was instrumental in the formation of Kerala Congress, the first regional party in India

Death
Padmanabhan died on 25 February 1970 at the age of 92, after age related complications. Mannam memorial (or Samādhi) is located at NSS Headquarters Changanacherry. He is regarded as the reformer and moral guide of the members of Nair community.

See also
 Nair Service Society
 Mahatma Gandhi College
 Mannam Memorial N.S.S College
 NSS College of Engineering

Notes

References
Postage stamp issued details on Mannathu Padmanabhan  
V. Balakrishnan & R. Leela Devi, 1982, Mannathu Padmanabhan and the revival of Nairs in Kerala, Vikas Publishing House, New Delhi.

Brief Biography by Ministry of Information and Broadcasting, Government of INDIA
Mannathu Padmanabhan-Indian Post

External links
 

Indian independence activists from Kerala
Malayali politicians
Recipients of the Padma Bhushan in social work
Politicians from Kottayam
1878 births
1970 deaths
Indian social reformers
Social workers
20th-century Indian educational theorists
19th-century Indian educational theorists
Social workers from Kerala
People from Changanassery
History of Changanassery
Kerala Congress politicians